Joseph Edward Nichols (born November 26, 1976) is an American country music artist. Between 1996 and 2001, he held recording contracts with the Intersound and Giant labels. In 2002, he signed with Universal South Records, now known as Show Dog-Universal Music.

Nichols began his career with The Rodeo Band, playing in high school gymnasiums and small clubs. Throughout the course of his career, Nichols has released nine studio albums: Joe Nichols (1996), Man with a Memory (2002), Revelation, A Traditional Christmas (both 2004), III (2005), Real Things (2007), Old Things New (2009), Crickets (2013), and Never Gets Old (2017). These albums have produced over 14 Top 40 singles on the Billboard Hot Country Songs and Country Airplay charts, including the Number One singles "Brokenheartsville", "Tequila Makes Her Clothes Fall Off", "Gimmie That Girl", "Sunny and 75", and the RIAA GOLD-certified single "Yeah", as well as five other Top 10 entries.

In October 2012, Nichols signed to Red Bow, a new partnership of Broken Bow Records and RED Distribution.

Biography
Joe Nichols was born and raised in Rogers, Arkansas. He was the second son born to Michael Curtis Nichols (May 29, 1956 - July 16, 2002) and Robin Larson Nichols.  Joe has an older brother Michael Curtis Jr. and two younger sisters, Kelli Francis and Lacey Nichols.  His father, who worked as a trucker, also played bass guitar in local country bands; eventually, Nichols himself found work in a local rock band, before taking a job as a country disc jockey. Nichols has stated that his father is part Cherokee and his mother is part Comanche.

Musical career

Through a meeting with record producer Randy Edwards, Nichols began to work on his singing and songwriting skills. At age 19, he was signed to his first record deal, with an independent label known as Intersound Records. There, Nichols released his first album, 1996's Joe Nichols. Despite the minor success of its lead-off single "Six of One, Half a Dozen of the Other" (which reached No. 74 on the RPM country charts in Canada), the album sold poorly and he was dropped from Intersound's roster. A second record deal, this time with Giant Records, was short-lived and did not produce any singles or albums. After his short-lived record deals, he took many jobs in Nashville, including moving furniture, installing cable TV systems, and selling steaks door to door.

1999–2003: Man with a Memory
In 1999, Nichols met Brent Rowan, a Nashville session guitarist who helped him land a recording contract with Universal South Records (which became Show Dog-Universal Music in December 2009). July 2002 was the release of his second album, entitled Man with a Memory. Its lead-off single, "The Impossible", went on to become a No. 3 hit on the Billboard Hot Country Singles & Tracks (now Hot Country Songs) charts, and was declared by Billboard as the tenth most-played country song of 2003. The same year, his debut album was re-issued under the title Six of One, Half a Dozen of the Other.

Man with a Memory earned Nichols a Top New Male Vocalist award from the Academy of Country Music, as well as three Grammy Award nominations and platinum certification from the Recording Industry Association of America (RIAA). Its second single, "Brokenheartsville", became his first No. 1 hit on the Billboard country charts in 2003, while "She Only Smokes When She Drinks" and "Cool to Be a Fool" both reached Top 20. Also in 2003, Nichols received the Country Music Association's Horizon Award.

2004–2007: Revelation, III and Real Things
Nichols spent most of 2004 on tour with Alan Jackson. In June of that year, he issued his third studio album, Revelation. It produced two Top Ten hits in "If Nobody Believed in You" and "What's a Guy Gotta Do", at No. 10 and No. 4 respectively. Later that same year, he also issued an album of Christmas music, entitled A Traditional Christmas. Four of the tracks from this album received enough airplay to enter the country charts.

III was Nichols' fourth album and was released in October 2005. Its lead-off single, "Tequila Makes Her Clothes Fall Off," became his second Billboard Number One hit, and both the single and the album receiving Gold certifications from the RIAA. The album also produced the Top Ten hits "Size Matters (Someday)" and "I'll Wait for You", at No. 9 and No. 7, respectively. In 2005, Anna Nicole Smith met Nichols at the Grand Ole Opry and she became a fan. After Smith's death, he performed two songs ("Wings of a Dove" and "I'll Wait for You") at her funeral service. Nichols joined Toby Keith on tours in both 2005 and 2006.

Nichols' fifth album, Real Things, was released in August 2007. Its two singles, Another Side of You" and "It Ain't No Crime," were both Top 20 country hits. The album also included a cover of "Let's Get Drunk and Fight," which Canadian singer Aaron Lines released as a single in 2008.

2008–2011: Old Things New and It's All Good
Nichols released a new single, "Believers," to radio on March 27, 2009. Written by Ashley Gorley, Wade Kirby and Bill Luther, it was the first single from his sixth album, Old Things New. The song failed to reach the Top 20, reaching a peak of number 26. However, the album's second single, "Gimmie That Girl," became Nichols' third Number One hit on the country charts in May 2010. The album's third single, "The Shape I'm In," was released in July 2010 and peaked at number 17 on the country charts.

Following a merger with his label and Show Dog Records, It's All Good was his seventh album released on November 8, 2011, via Show Dog-Universal Music. The album's only single "Take It Off" peaked at number 25 on the country charts, and Nichols parted ways with Show Dog-Universal in May 2012.

2012–2015: Crickets
After parting ways with his longtime label, Nichols signed in October 2012 to Red Bow, a new partnership of Broken Bow Records and RED Distribution.

On April 22, 2013, "Sunny and 75" premiered exclusively online at AOL's The Boot.  The song was available on iTunes May 7, 2013. On Monday, May 13, it was announced that the song had the biggest country radio add week of his entire career, with 52 first week adds. It peaked at number one on the Country Airplay chart in December 2013. Nichols' eighth studio album, Crickets, was released on October 8, 2013. On January 9, 2014, it was announced that "Sunny and 75" was certified Gold by the RIAA for single sales in excess of 500,000 digital downloads. The album's second single, "Yeah", was released to country radio on January 27, 2014. It reached number one on the Country Airplay chart in July 2014. The album's third single, "Hard to Be Cool", was released to country radio on September 1, 2014.

In 2014, he sang, together with Lucy Hale, the song "Red Dress", which appears on her album, Road Between.

2015–2020: Never Gets Old
It was announced on Nichols' website that the lead single to his ninth studio album, titled "Freaks Like Me", would be released to digital retailers on September 18, 2015, and to radio on September 21, 2015.  Nichols released the new single "Undone" on May 12, 2016  and released his ninth studio album Never Gets Old on July 28, 2017, on Broken Bow Records. "Freaks Like Me" and "Undone" are not included on the new album. Joe parted ways with Broken Bow Music Group in August 2018.

2021–present: Good Day for Living
On April 23, 2021, Nichols released his first new single in three years titled "Home Run". The song impacted country radio on May 10 under Quartz Hill.

Nichols' likeness, along the Quartz Hills Records logo, was featured on the #8 car of Tyler Reddick at NASCAR's Goodyear 400 race at Darlington Raceway on May 9, 2021.

Nichols tenth studio album, Good Day for Living was released in February 2022.

Personal life
On January 8, 2005, Nichols returned to Nashville to see a therapist after causing a scene in Steamboat Springs, Colorado, while intoxicated on amphetamines and alcohol. He had been battling an addiction since 2002 after the death of his father. On October 13, 2007, Nichols was checked into a substance abuse rehabilitation program.

Nichols married Heather Singleton on September 9, 2007, in Savannah, Georgia. He had known Singleton since they were both 19 years old. The couple have two daughters. Nichols also has another daughter, born 1998, from a previous relationship.

Nichols is a lifelong fan of the St. Louis Cardinals.

Discography

Joe Nichols (1996)
Man with a Memory (2002)
Revelation (2004)
III (2005)
Real Things (2007)
Old Things New (2009)
It's All Good (2011)
Crickets (2013)
Never Gets Old (2017)
Good Day for Living (2022)

References

1976 births
American country singer-songwriters
American people of Cherokee descent
BBR Music Group artists
Singer-songwriters from Arkansas
Country musicians from Arkansas
People from Rogers, Arkansas
Living people
Show Dog-Universal Music artists
21st-century American singers